Gerosis is an Indomalayan genus of spread-winged skippers in the family Hesperiidae.There are six species found from China and Northeast India to Java and the Sula Archipelago east of Sulawesi.They are lowland (less than 650 metres) forest (primary or advanced secondary) butterflies. They seek sunny areas between 1 and 4 metres above ground, but females can be encountered in the shade.

Species
Gerosis bhagava  (Moore, [1866]) 
Gerosis limax  (Plötz, 1884)  Burma, Thailand, Malay Peninsula, Singapore, Borneo, Sumatra
Gerosis phisara  (Moore, 1884) 
Gerosis sinica  (C. & R. Felder, 1862)  North East India Burma, Laos, Thailand, South and Central China, Yunnan
Gerosis yuani  Huang, 2003  Yunnan
Gerosis tristis  (Eliot, 1959)  Malaya, Vietnam
Gerosis corona  (Semper, 1892)  Philippines
Gerosis celebica  (C. & R. Felder, [1867])  Celebes

Biology 
The larvae feed on Leguminosae including Abrus, Amphicarpaea, Dalbergia

References

Natural History Museum Lepidoptera genus database
 Gerosis  Mabille, 1903 at Markku Savela's Lepidoptera and Some Other Life Forms

Tagiadini
Hesperiidae genera
Taxa named by Paul Mabille